Wind Up Toys is the third studio album from UK punk band Capdown released on February 5, 2007. It is also the first Capdown album to be released on the Fierce Panda Records label. Anyone who pre-ordered the album from Banquet Records in Kingston (UK) would get signed copies of the album as well as a free three live track EP.

Track listing 
"Truly Dead
"Blood, Sweat and Fears"
"Wind Up Toys"
"Terms and Conditions Apply"
"Surviving The Death of a Genre"
"No Matter What"
"Thrash Tuesday"
"Generation Next"
"Keeping Up Appearances"
"Strictly Business"
"Community Service"
"Home Is Where the Start Is"

Japanese bonus tracks
13. "Keeping Up Appearances" (demo)
14. "Wind Up Toys" (demo)
15. "Segue"
16. "Surviving The Death of a Genre" (demo)

References

2007 albums
Capdown albums
Fierce Panda Records albums